Jean-François Brémond, a pupil of Ingres and Couder, was born in Paris in 1807. He produced portraits as well as historical pictures. His death occurred in Paris in 1868. Among his paintings are:

Portrait of his Daughter.
St. Francis of Assisi.
St. Catharine of Alexandria.
The Entry of Christ into Jerusalem.
Bogwali the Great of 69th.
Susannah in the Bath.

References
 

1807 births
1868 deaths
19th-century French painters
French male painters
Painters from Paris
19th-century French male artists